Ajit Kadkade is a devotional singer in Goa and Maharashtra, India. He was born in Bicholim city of Goa on January 11. He learnt Hindustani classical music from the famous singer Pt. Jitendra Abhisheki. Kadkade specializes in singing Marathi devotional songs (bhajans), abhangs, natya sangeet and Hindustani classical music.

Famous bhajans sung by him include "Zoli bhar kar Lana", Nighalo gheun datta chi palkhi"Vrundavani Venu", "Devacha Dev bai thakada", "Bramha Shodhile Bramhand Milale", "Pag ghungaru bandh Mira nachi thi", "Khai ba sakhar loni mazya bala", "Devachiye Dwari Ubha Kshana bhari", "Naam Tujhe Barve Ga Shankar", "Nirmala Ma Bhagawati", "Marma bandhatali Thev hi" and "Swaliya Giri Dhari lala Khabar lena meri". His other famous abhang includes Nache Ganeshu which is one of his topmost selling Marathi bhajan album.

References

Hindustani singers
Marathi-language singers
21st-century Indian male classical singers
Place of birth missing (living people)
Year of birth missing (living people)
Living people